Partners in Crime is a 2014 Taiwanese crime film directed by Chang Jung-chi. It was screened in the Contemporary World Cinema section at the 2014 Toronto International Film Festival.

Cast
 Wu Chien-ho as Huang Li-hai
 Deng Yu-kai as Lin Yong-chuan
 Cheng Kai-yuan as Yeh Yi-kai 
 Ko Chia-yen as School counselor
 Lee Lieh as  Hsia's mother 
 Frankie Huang as Police officer
 Wen Chen-ling as Chu Ching-yi
 Yao Ai-ning as Hsia Wei-chiao 
 Vincent Liang as Discipline master
 Sunny Hung as Huang Yung-chen 
 Huang Tsai-yi as Mother
 Cheer Chen as Singer

References

External links
 

2014 films
2014 crime films
Taiwanese crime films
2010s Mandarin-language films